The 2010 Commonwealth Shooting Federation Championships were held at the Dr. Karni Singh Shooting Range in New Delhi, India from 19 to 27 February 2010. They served as a test event for that year's Commonwealth Games despite a four-month postponement necessitated by venue construction delays.

Medalists 
Results were as follows:

Men

Pistol

Rifle

Shotgun

Women

Pistol

Rifle

Shotgun

Medal table

References

External links 
 Results book

2010 in shooting sports
International sports competitions hosted by India
Sport in New Delhi
2010 in Indian sport
Shooting competitions in India